Cecil Rogers (11 November 1907 – 26 January 1970) was a Barbadian cricketer. He played in two first-class matches for the Barbados cricket team in 1935/36 and 1936/37.

See also
 List of Barbadian representative cricketers

References

External links
 

1907 births
1970 deaths
Barbadian cricketers
Barbados cricketers
People from Saint Michael, Barbados